Rizalino S. Navarro (December 30, 1938 – July 7, 2011) was a Filipino businessman, business executive and politician. Navarro served as the Secretary of Trade and Industry from 1992 to 1996 within the Cabinet of former Philippines President Fidel Ramos.

Navarro earned a bachelor's degree in business administration cum laude from University of the East. He earned a Master of Business Administration from Harvard Business School.

Navarro also served as the chief executive officer of both SGV & Co., the largest accounting firm in the Philippines, and Rizal Commercial Banking Corporation (RCBC). Navrro launched his career at SGV in 1982 and rose to managing director of the firm by 1992, when he left to become Secretary of Trade.

He became Secretary of Trade through the invitation of then Finance Secretary Ramon del Rosario, who was one of Navarro's classmates at Harvard University.

Rizalino Navarro died of an apparent heart attack at the RCBC corporate gym in Makati on July 7, 2011, at the age of 72.

References

1938 births
2011 deaths
20th-century Filipino businesspeople
Harvard Business School alumni
Secretaries of Trade and Industry of the Philippines
University of the East alumni
Ramos administration cabinet members